The Mrs. Colorado competition is the pageant that selects the representative for the state of Colorado in the Mrs. America pageant. The event was held in Arvada from 1992 to 1998 (1995-1998 titles) and moved to Denver in 1999. The Pageant has been held in the Ellie Caulkins Opera House in the Denver Performing Arts Complex.

From 1990 to 2008, the Mrs. Colorado state pageant was directed by Tricia Dampier, based in Littleton, Colorado. In 2008, it was taken over by Abundance Productions, based in Parker, Colorado. Abundance Productions is owned and operated by Emily Stark. Colorado has been one of the consistent successful states at Mrs. America, having one Mrs. America (Mrs. America 2006 Marney Andes after Diane Hardgrove was crowned Mrs. World, Marney became Mrs. America), one first runner-up, two 2nd Runner up and one Top 6 and eight Top 10 placements.

Results summary 
The following is a visual summary of the past results of Mrs. Colorado titleholders at the national Mrs. America pageants/competitions. The year in parentheses indicates the year of the national competition during which a placement and/or award was garnered, not the year attached to the contestant's state title.

Placements
 Mrs. America  Marney Andes (2006)
 1st runner-up: Debi Barnhill (1993)
 2nd runner-up: Janell Ames (2011)
 Top 6: Shalon Polson (2010)
 Top 10: Shae Stuart (1999), Raeanne Smith (2000), Emily Stark (2002), Megan Yarberry (2009), Nicki Myers (2014), Mette Castor (2015), Valerie Daly (2017), Nicole Covney (2020), Sylvia Waller (2022)

Colorado holds a record of thirteen placements at Mrs. America.

Awards
 Best Costume: Raeanne Smith (2000), Nicole Covney (2020), Danette Haag (2021), Corrie Francis (2021)
 Publication: Erica Shields (2016)
 Mrs. Photogenic: Lauren Campbell (2018)

Winners

References

External links
 Mrs Colorado official website

Colorado
Colorado culture
Women in Colorado
1939 establishments in Colorado
Annual events in Colorado